C36 or C-36 may refer to:

Vehicles 
Aircraft
 Caspar C 36, a German reconnaissance aircraft
 Castel C-36, a French glider
 EKW C-36, a Swiss multi-purpose combat aircraft
 Lockheed C-36 Electra, an American military transport aircraft

Automobiles
 Covini C36 Turbotronic, an Italian concept car
 DFSK C36, a Chinese van
 Mercedes-Benz C36 AMG, a German automobile
 Sauber C36, a Swiss Formula One car

Locomotives
 New South Wales C36 class locomotive, an Australian steam locomotive

Ships
 , a C-class submarine of the Royal Navy

Other uses 
 C-36 (cipher machine)
 C36 road (Namibia)
 15 cm TbtsK C/36 naval gun, a German medium-caliber naval gun
 Bill C-36, various legislation of the Parliament of Canada
 Caldwell 36, a spiral galaxy
 King's Gambit, a chess opening